Jaime Emma (1938–2005) was an Argentine journalist, lawyer and chess player.  He won the Argentine Chess Championship in 1978, the same year he won the title of International Master.

Argentine chess players
1938 births
2005 deaths
Argentine journalists
Male journalists
20th-century Argentine lawyers
Sportspeople from Buenos Aires
20th-century chess players
20th-century journalists